Mugrón mac Flainn (died 782) was a king of the Uí Failge, a Laigin people of County Offaly. He was one of the many sons of Fland Dá Chongal, a previous king. He ruled from 770 to 782. He was the third of Fland's sons by Érenach, daughter of Murchad Midi (died 715) of Uisnech, to hold the throne.

Mugrón aligned with Bran Ardchenn mac Muiredaig (died 795), claimant to the Leinster throne (who was also allied to the high king Donnchad Midi) versus the incumbent king Ruaidrí mac Fáeláin (died 785). They were however defeated at the Battle of Curragh (near Kildare) and Mugrón was slain.

His sons Óengus mac Mugróin (died 803) and Cináed mac Mugróin (died 829) were Kings of the Uí Failge. Another son Colcu was ancestor Clann Colgcan in northern Offaly (centered in the barony of Lower Philipstown).

See also
 Kings of Ui Failghe

Notes

References
 Annals of Ulster at University College Cork
 Byrne, Francis John (2001), Irish Kings and High-Kings, Dublin: Four Courts Press, 
 Mac Niocaill, Gearoid (1972), Ireland before the Vikings, Dublin: Gill and Macmillan
 Book of Leinster,Rig hua Falge at University College Cork

External links
CELT: Corpus of Electronic Texts at University College Cork

782 deaths
People from County Offaly
Monarchs killed in action
8th-century Irish monarchs
Year of birth unknown